Black Death are an American band who have been noted as the "first all-African-American heavy metal band". The group were also mentioned in Ian Christe's book Sound of the Beast: The Complete Headbanging History of Heavy Metal, and mentioned in Rock 'n' Roll and the Cleveland Connection by Deanna R. Adams as "one of the only, if not the only, all-black metal bands in the country" in 1987.

History

Lineup, name, and status 
Black Death was formed in 1977 by guitarist Greg Hicks, drummer Phil Bullard, and bassist Clayborn Pinkins as an unnamed group. They persisted for a year without a vocalist until Siki Spacek joined; Spacek would also fulfill roles as a guitarist for the band alongside Hicks. The band would not have an official name until nearly two years after its creation; Hicks and Pinkins eventually decided on "Black Death." Shortly thereafter, Pinkins was shot and killed. The resulting lineup changes consisted of two new bassists, the latter of which, Darell Harris, would become the final member of the classic lineup heard on the band's debut album.

At the end of the band's first major hiatus, which lasted from 1988 to 2009, the lineup took another significant turn when the band was officially re-formed as "Mandrake." There was an unofficial change in 2007 by Bullard in an effort to change Black Death's name, but this was not fulfilled until after his death in 2008 from colon cancer. The band was then split into two separate groups, one of which was rechristened as Siki Spacek and the Resurrection (later known as Black Death Resurrected, which was Bullard's original idea for the band's new name); the second group toured until disbanding in 2010.

Currently, the band's activities and scheduling, along with other announcements, are actively being listed on their Facebook page.

Recording efforts and distribution 
As of the current day, Black Death has one full-length album under its belt, although there have been past rumors about a second full length, which were almost fulfilled in a release of a "1998 [LP]-length demo." Several unnamed demos were recorded in their formative years, after the death of Pinkins in 1979. A 2017 compilation of older recording was also released, and is currently Black Death's only recording available on Spotify.

Additionally, Black Death's first LP has been re-released in physical format by records and distribution company Hell's Headbangers. This republishing sparked a mild revival in interest with the band, with magazines such as Decibel and Kerrang! acknowledging the band's existence once more.

Discography 
Studio albums
Black Death (1984)
Compilation albums
Until We Rock: The Early Recordings Of Black Death (2017)
Compilation appearances
Cleveland Metal (1983 compilation)
1. Taken by Force
2. Until We Rock

Band members

Current members
Greg Hicks – guitar, bass (1977–1985)

Notable past members
Siki Spacek – vocals, guitar (1977–1988)
Phil Bullard – drums (1977–1985)
Clayborn Pinkins – bass (1977–1979)
Darrell Harris – bass (1980–1985)
Stanley Gore - drums (1986–1988)
Joe Harris - bass (1987–1988)
Vincent Lindsay	- guitars (1987–1988)

References

Sources 
 Greg Hicks – founding member and current Black Death copyright holder – http://www.blackdeathband.com
 Christe, Ian (2003). Sound of the Beast: The Complete Headbanging History of Heavy Metal. HarperCollins.

External links 
 Official Myspace site
 
 

African-American heavy metal musical groups
Heavy metal musical groups from Ohio
Musical groups from Cleveland
Musical groups established in 1977